Gun Barrel is a German heavy metal band formed in 1998 in Cologne, North Rhine-Westphalia. Gun Barrel was founded by Guido Feldhausen and Rolf Tanzius and released their first EP Back To Suicide (2000) with the line-up consisting of Guido Feldhausen (vocals), Rolf Tanzius (guitar), Holger Schulz (bass) and Florens Neuheuser (drums). They play traditional/old school heavy metal and they personally call their musical style "Power dive rock 'n' metal". So far they have released six studio albums, Power-Dive (2001), Battle-Tested (2003), Bombard Your Soul (2005), Outlaw Invasion (2008), Brace For Impact (2012) and Damage Dancer (2014). Rolf Tanzius is currently the only original band member.

Band members

Current members 
 Patrick Sühl — vocals (since Brace For Impact)
 Rolf Tanzius — guitar (since Back To Suicide)
 Tom "Tomcat" Kintgen — bass (since Bombard Your Soul)
 Toni Pinciroli — drums (since Battle-Tested)

Former members 
 Silver — vocals (on Live At The Kubana)
 Xaver Drexler — vocals (on Bombard Your Soul, Outlaw Invasion) - died on March 28, 2010.
 Guido Feldhausen — vocals (on Back To Suicide, Power-Dive, Battle-Tested)
 Holger Schulz — bass (on Back To Suicide, Power-Dive, Battle-Tested)
 Willi Tüpprath — bass (not on any album)
 Florens Neuheuser — drums (on Back To Suicide)

Discography

Albums 
 Power-Dive (2001)
 Battle-Tested (2003)
 Bombard Your Soul (2005)
 Outlaw Invasion (2008)
 Live At The Kubana -Live (2010)
 Brace For Impact (2012)
 Damage Dancer (2014)

Demos, singles and EPs 
 Bomb Attack, demo (1999)
 Back To Suicide, EP (2000)
 Back To Suicide, single (2004)

References

External links
 Encyclopa Metallum
 Official site

German heavy metal musical groups